is a Japanese women's professional shogi player ranked 1-dan.

Promotion history
Odaka's promotion history is as follows:

 3-kyū: June 20, 2017
 2-kyū: February 7, 2018
 1-kyū: October 14, 2019
 1-dan: April 1, 2021

Note: All ranks are women's professional ranks.

References

External links
 ShogiHub: Odaka, Sakiko

2002 births
Living people
People from Sakura, Chiba
Japanese shogi players
Women's professional shogi players
Professional shogi players from Chiba Prefecture